How They Get There is a 1997 short film directed by Spike Jonze, which illustrates how lonely shoes wind up in the gutter. It is featured on The Work of Director Spike Jonze DVD and can currently be viewed on YouTube.

Plot
The opening shot is of a shoe lying in the gutter. It belongs to a man who is leaning against a parked car drinking a carton of milk. After a moment, the owner of the car then angrily tells him to stop. As the man walks off, he spots a woman across the road and as he stumbles on the curb - the woman mimics him. He looks at her oddly. She again copies him as he discards his milk carton on a fence and swings his arms. They continue mimicking each other until we see that the man is approaching a crossing in the road. However, the man is enjoying the game too much to realise the danger and continues to imitate the woman who is trying to warn him of the oncoming traffic. He is then struck by a car which flips over and forces his shoe to fly through the air and land in the gutter.

Music
The music playing through the movie is "Sentimental Journey" by Juan García Esquivel (originally written by Les Brown and Ben Home).

Cast
Rico Bueno as Angry Man
Lauren Curry as Girl
Mark Gonzales as Guy

External links 
 

Films directed by Spike Jonze
1997 short films
1997 films
1990s English-language films